Dulce may refer to:

Places
Dulce, New Mexico
Dulce Base, a supposed American secret military facility
Golfo Dulce, Costa Rica
Dulce River (disambiguation)

People
Dulce (Filipino singer) (born 1961), Filipino singer and actress
Dulce (Mexican singer) (born 1955), Mexican singer and actress
Ana Dulce Félix (born 1982), Portuguese long-distance runner
Dulce Maria Alavez (born 2014), American child who has been missing since 2019
Dulce of Aragon (1160–1198), wife of King Sancho I of Portugal
Dulce García, a wrestler and boxer better known as Sexy Star
Dulce of León, Queen of León
Dulce María (born 1985), Mexican actress
Dulce Figueiredo, Brazilian First Lady 1979–1985
Dulce Piña (born 1966), Dominican Republic judoka
Dulce Pontes (born 1969), Portuguese singer
Dulce María Serret (1898–1989), Cuban pianist and music teacher
Irmã Dulce Pontes (1914–1992), Brazilian Catholic nun who founded the Obras Sociais Irmã Dulce
Dulce María Loynaz, Cuban writer
Dulce (footballer) (born 1982), Dúlcia Maria Davi, Brazilian footballer

Music
Dulce (album), by Sun City Girls, or the title song, 1998
"Dulce" (song), by Francisca Valenzuela, 2006

Food and drink
Dulce (wine), a sweet variety of sparkling wine
Dulce de leche, milk-based syrup
Pan dulce, Latin American "sweet bread"

See also
Dolce (disambiguation)
Dulcie, a feminine given name
Dulse, red algae